In cryptography, Skipjack is a block cipher—an algorithm for encryption—developed by the U.S. National Security Agency (NSA). Initially classified, it was originally intended for use in the controversial Clipper chip. Subsequently, the algorithm was declassified.

History of Skipjack
Skipjack was proposed as the encryption algorithm in a US government-sponsored scheme of key escrow, and the cipher was provided for use in the Clipper chip, implemented in tamperproof hardware. Skipjack is used only for encryption; the key escrow is achieved through the use of a separate mechanism known as the Law Enforcement Access Field (LEAF).

The algorithm was initially secret, and was regarded with considerable suspicion by many for that reason. It was declassified on 24 June 1998, shortly after its basic design principle had been discovered independently by the public cryptography community.

To ensure public confidence in the algorithm, several academic researchers from outside the government were called in to evaluate the algorithm. The researchers found no problems with either the algorithm itself or the evaluation process. Moreover, their report gave some insight into the (classified) history and development of Skipjack:

In March 2016, NIST published a draft of its cryptographic standard which no longer certifies Skipjack for US government applications.

Description
Skipjack uses an 80-bit key to encrypt or decrypt 64-bit data blocks. It is an unbalanced Feistel network with 32 rounds. It was designed to be used in secured phones.

Cryptanalysis
Eli Biham and Adi Shamir discovered an attack against 16 of the 32 rounds within one day of declassification, and (with Alex Biryukov) extended this to 31 of the 32 rounds (but with an attack only slightly faster than exhaustive search) within months using impossible differential cryptanalysis.

A truncated differential attack was also published against 28 rounds of Skipjack cipher.

A claimed attack against the full cipher was published in 2002, but a later paper with attack designer as a co-author clarified in 2009 that no attack on the full 32 round cipher was then known.

In pop culture
An algorithm named Skipjack forms part of the back-story to Dan Brown's 1998 novel Digital Fortress. In Brown's novel, Skipjack is proposed as the new public-key encryption standard, along with a back door secretly inserted by the NSA ("a few lines of cunning programming") which would have allowed them to decrypt Skipjack using a secret password and thereby "read the world's email". When details of the cipher are publicly released, programmer Greg Hale discovers and announces details of the backdoor. In real life there is evidence to suggest that the NSA has added back doors to at least one algorithm; the Dual_EC_DRBG random number algorithm may contain a backdoor accessible only to the NSA.

Additionally, in the Half-Life 2 modification Dystopia, the "encryption" program used in cyberspace apparently uses both Skipjack and Blowfish algorithms.

References

Further reading

External links
 SCAN's entry for the cipher
 fip185 Escrowed Encryption Standard EES

Type 2 encryption algorithms
National Security Agency cryptography